Lechenaultia chlorantha, commonly known as Kalbarri leschenaultia, is a species of flowering plant in the family Goodeniaceae and is endemic to a restricted area near Kalbarri in Western Australia. It is a subshrub or shrub with many branches, crowded, narrow, fleshy leaves and pale bluish-green, tube-shaped flowers.

Description

Taxonomy
Lechenaultia chlorantha was first formally described in 1860 by Ferdinand von Mueller in Fragmenta Phytographiae Australiae from specimens collected near the Murchison River. The specific epithet (chlorantha) means "green-flowered".

Distribution and habitat
Kalbarri leschenaultia grows in rocky sandstone near the mouth of the Murchison River at Kalbarri in the Geraldton Sandplains biogeographic region of south-western Western Australia.

Conservation status
This lechenaultia is listed as "vulnerable" under the Australian Government Environment Protection and Biodiversity Conservation Act 1999 and as "Threatened Flora (Declared Rare Flora — Extant)" by the Department of Biodiversity, Conservation and Attractions

References

chlorantha
Garden plants of Australia
Plants described in 1860
Taxa named by Ferdinand von Mueller